Zambia is divided into ten provinces, each administered by an appointed deputy minister. Each province is divided into several districts with a total of 116 districts. The provinces are:

 Central
 Copperbelt
 Eastern
 Luapula
 Lusaka
 Muchinga 
 Northern
 North-Western
 Southern
 Western

Notes

References

 
Zambia
Zambia